Sobiranistes is a political party of the republican and Catalan sovereigntist left, formed by a splinter group from Catalunya en Comú (CatComú) led by Joan Josep Nuet and Elisenda Alamany, deputies in the Parliament of Catalonia.

History 
Sobiranistes was initially constituted on 23 October 2018 as a political platform the Catalunya en Comú–Podem group in the Parliament of Catalonia by deputies Elisenda Alamany and Joan Josep Nuet, under the Som comuns, som sobiranistes (We are common, we are sovereigntist) motto. The goal of the platform was to "right" the course of the perceived drift of CatComú towards "the vices of traditional parties", were very critical of the role of Initiative for Catalonia Greens (ICV) within the party, and accused CatComú's leader Ada Colau of having "abandoned sovereigntism" and of "disbanding Xavier Domènech's team", after the latter's resigned as Podemos regional secretary-general and Catalan deputy. CatComú's leadership would criticize Alamany for "poor transparency" as well as the platform's establishment not being done according to internal party procedures.

Sobiranistes was formally registered as a party on 21 February 2019, with Alamany and Nuet breaking up from Catalunya en Comú, and subsequently entering coalition talks with Republican Left of Catalonia (ERC) ahead of the April 2019 Spanish general election. Such alliance was formalized in March under the Republican Left of Catalonia–Sovereigntists label, with the agreement providing for Sobiranistes to field candidates within ERC's list for Barcelona. The alliance was maintained for the November 2019 general election. Alamany also registered the Nova–New Future political party on 11 March, reaching an agreement with ERC to support Ernest Maragall's run to the mayorship of Barcelona in the 2019 municipal election.

During the COVID-19 pandemic, Sobiranistes broke ERC's group discipline in several occasions by abstaining—rather than opposing—in the votings for the proroguing of the state of alarm.

Electoral performance

Cortes Generales

Notes

References

External links

2019 establishments in Catalonia
Political parties in Catalonia
Political parties established in 2019
Socialist parties in Catalonia